The 60th Fighter Squadron is a United States Air Force unit that is part of the 33d Fighter Wing at Eglin Air Force Base, Florida;  It is tasked with training pilots on the Lockheed Martin F-35A Lightning II.

History

World War II
Activated in 1940 at Mitchel Field, New York as the 60th Pursuit Squadron, the unit was assigned to the 33d Pursuit Group on 15 January 1941.  Redesignated as the 60th Fighter Squadron "Fighting Crows" on 15 May 1942, the unit was responsible for the continual mission of air defense of the United States until October 1942.  In late 1942, the 60th joined the United States' effort in World War II by participating in combat operations in the Mediterranean Theater and the China-Burma-India Theater.  As a result of superior performance in central Tunisia, the 60th earned the Distinguished Unit Citation for combat operations on 15 January 1944.  Following its service in World War II, the 60th was assigned to the 33d Fighter Group at Neubiberg Air Base, Germany in August 1946 and flew the North American P-51 Mustang.

Air Defense Command

In 1947, the 60th transferred to Roswell Army Air Field, New Mexico and soon afterward, in June 1948, converted to the Republic F-84 Thunderjet.  In November 1948, the 60th transferred to Otis Air Force Base, Massachusetts and by June of the following year had completed a conversion to the new North American F-86 Sabre.  On 9 August 1950, the 60th moved to Westover Air Force Base, Massachusetts and on 1 January 1951 became part of the Air Defense Command.  From 1952 to 1959, the 60th, flying the F-86 Sabre and the Lockheed F-94 Starfire, was assigned to various organizations including the 4707th Defense Wing, 4735th Air Defense Group and the Boston Air Defense Sector.

On 5 January 1959, the 60th was the first Air Defense Command squadron to receive the new McDonnell F-101B Voodoo interceptor.  The unit was additionally tasked as part of the joint test force (teamed with members at Eglin Air Force Base, Florida) to test the F-101's operational capabilities prior to its entrance into active service.  The F-101B proved to be a quite successful interceptor. assigned alongside the F-101B interceptor was the F-101F operational and conversion trainer. The two-seat trainer version was equipped with dual controls, but carried the same armament as the F-101B and were fully combat-capable.

During the 1960s, the 60th participated in various tests, exercises, and operations in the Air Defense Command.  In October and November 1962, the unit was placed on alert during the Cuban Missile Crisis, and several planes with weapons and support crews were deployed to support potential combat needs.  Planes remaining at Otis continued to perform the Air Defense Command continental air defense mission. Although it has been stated that F-101B Voodoos from the 60th were used in the production of the 1966 comedy The Russians Are Coming, the Russians Are Coming, the film, although set in New England, was actually shot on the West Coast for financial reasons and the fighters were from the 84th Fighter-Interceptor Squadron, based at Hamilton Air Force Base, California. The 60th inactivated on 30 April 1971.

Tactical Air Command

In September 1971, the squadron was reactivated at Eglin Air Force Base, Florida as the 60th Tactical Fighter Squadron of the 33d Tactical Fighter Wing, flying the McDonnell F-4E Phantom II until transitioning to the McDonnell Douglas F-15A Eagle in the late 1970s.  In 1979, the unit participated in the "Kadena Ready Eagle" program in which the members of the 60th trained new F-15 pilots stationed at Kadena Air Base, Japan.

The 60th made its first combat deployment since World War II when it sent ten F-15s to Grenada in support of Operation Urgent Fury, the rescue of American medical students held in Grenada in the mid-1980s.  The unit continued to train and until it was called upon to fly support missions for Operation Just Cause (the removal of Panamanian dictator Manuel Noriega from Panama in the early 1990s).

Air Combat Command
The 60th Fighter Squadron flew the F-15 Eagle and supported the various combatant commanders by providing air superiority on call. In September 1990 members, both maintainers and pilots, of the 60th were deployed in support of Operation Desert Storm as augmentees to its sister squadron the 58th. This led to the most aerial victories by any single unit since Viet Nam. The squadron also participated in Operation Noble Eagle following 9/11. It flew its last F-15 mission on 5 December 2008.   The squadron was inactivated on 1 January 2009.

Air Education and Training Command
The squadron was reactivated on 20 August 2021 as the second formal training unit of the 33d Operations Group, 33d Fighter Wing.  The 33d is assigned to the Nineteenth Air Force of AETC.

Lineage
 Constituted as the 60th Pursuit Squadron (Interceptor) on 20 November 1940
 Activated on 15 January 1941
 Redesignated 60th Fighter Squadron on 15 May 1942
 Redesignated 60th Fighter Squadron, Two Engine on 8 February 1945
 Inactivated on 8 December 1945
 Redesignated 60th Fighter Squadron, Single Engine on 17 July 1946
 Activated on 20 August 1946
 Redesignated 60th Fighter Squadron, Jet on 14 June 1948
 Redesignated 60th Fighter-Interceptor Squadron on 20 January 1950
 Inactivated on 30 April 1971
 Redesignated 60th Tactical Fighter Squadron on 18 May 1971
 Activated on 1 September 1971
 Redesignated 60th Fighter Squadron on 1 November 1991
 Inactivated on 1 January 2009
 Activated on 20 August 2021

Assignments
 33d Pursuit Group (later 33d Fighter Group), 15 January 1941 – 8 December 1945
 33d Fighter Group (later 33d Fighter-Interceptor Group), 20 August 1946
 4707th Defense Wing (later 4707th Air Defense Wing), 6 February 1952
 33d Fighter Group, 18 August 1955
 4735th Air Defense Group, 18 August 1957
 Boston Air Defense Sector, 1 August 1959
 35th Air Division, 1 April 1966
 21st Air Division, 19 November 1969 – 30 April 1971
 33d Tactical Fighter Wing (later 33d Fighter) Wing), 1 September 1971
 33d Operations Group, 1 December 1991 – 1 January 2009
 33d operations Group, 20 August 2021 – present

Stations

 Mitchel Field, New York, 15 January 1941
 Bolling Field, District of Columbia, 8 December 1941 – 12 October 1942
 Port Lyautey Airfield, French Morocco, 10 November 1942
 Casablanca Airfield, French Morocco, 17 November 1942
 Oujda Airfield, French Morocco, 6 December 1942
 Telergma Airfield, Algeria, 26 December 1942
 Youks-les-Bains Airfield, Algeria, c. 6 January 1943
 Telergma Airfield, Algeria, 17 February 1943
 Berteaux Airfield, Algeria, 2 March 1943
 Ebba Ksour Airfield, Tunisia, 12 April 1943
 Menzel Temime Airfield, Tunisia, 22 May 1943
 Sousse Airfield, Tunisia, 10 June 1943

 Pantelleria Airfield, Italy, 21 June 1943
 Licata Airfield, Sicily, Italy, 17 July 1943
 Paestum Airfield, Italy, 13 September 1943
 Santa Maria Airfield, Italy, 18 November 1943 (operated from Paestum, Italy after 1 December 1943)
 Cercola Airfield, Italy, c. 1 January–c. 5 February 1944
 Karachi Airport, India (now Pakistan), c. 20 February 1944
 Shwangliu Airfield, China, c. 17 April 1944
 Nagaghuli Airfield, India, c. 1 September 1944
 Sahmaw Airfield, Burma, 20 November 1944
 Myitkyina Airfield, Burma, 8 May 1945

 Piardoba Airfield, India, 1 October–15 November 1945
 Camp Shanks, New York, 7–8 December 1945
 AAF Station Neubiberg, Germany, 20 August 1946
 AAF Station Bad Kissingen, Germany, July–25 August 1947
 Andrews Field, Maryland, 25 August 1947
 Roswell Army Air Field (later Roswell Air Force Base, Walker Air Force Base), New Mexico, 16 September 1947
 Otis Air Force Base, Massachusetts, 16 November 1948
 Westover Air Force Base, Massachusetts, 10 August 1950
 Otis Air Force Base, Massachusetts, 18 Aug 1955 – 30 April 1971
 Eglin Air Force Base, Florida, 1 September 1971 – 1 January 2009
 Eglin Air Force Base, Florida, 20 August 2021 – present

Aircraft

 Bell P-39 Airacobra (1941)
 Curtiss P-40 Warhawk (1941–1944)
 Republic P-47 Thunderbolt (1944–1945)
 Lockheed P-38 Lightning (1945)
 North American P-51 Mustang (1946–1949)
 Republic F-84 Thunderjet (1948–1950)
 North American F-86A Sabre, (1951)
 North American F-86E Sabre, (1951-1953)
 North American F-86D Sabre (1953–1955)
 Lockheed F-94C Starfire (1955–1959)
 McDonnell F-101B Voodoo (1959–1971)
 McDonnell F-4E Phantom II (1971-1979)
 McDonnel Douglas F-15A/B/C/D Eagle (1979–2009)
 Lockheed Martin F-35A Lightning II

References

Notes
 Explanatory notes

 Citations

Bibliography

See also

060
Military units and formations in Florida
060
Military units and formations established in 1940